The Army Academy R.O.C. (AAROC) is a military academy located in Zhongli District, Taoyuan City, Taiwan.

The academy offers a four-year program that covers a broad range of subjects, including military science, tactics, leadership, and physical fitness. In addition, students are required to take courses in mathematics, physics, chemistry, and other academic disciplines.

History
The AAROC was initially established as the ROC Army First Non-Commissioned Officers School in 1957 by President Chiang Kai-shek. It was then further integrated itself with the Second and Third Non-Commissioned Officers Schools where its scale gradually expanded. In August 2005, the school was officially reformed as the Army Academy R.O.C..

Faculties
 Aircraft Engineering Department
 Power Mechanical Engineering Department
 Electronic Engineering Department
 Computer Science and Communication Engineering Department
 Mechanical Engineering Department
 Chemical Engineering Department
 Vehicle Engineering Department
 Civil Engineering Department

Transportation
The university is accessible South East from Zhongli Station of Taiwan Railways.

See also
 List of universities in Taiwan
 Republic of China Army

References

External links

 
 

1957 establishments in Taiwan
Educational institutions established in 1957
Military academies of Taiwan
Universities and colleges in Taoyuan City
Republic of China Army